Slaven is a surname. Notable people with the surname include:

 Bernie Slaven (born 1960), Scottish-born Irish football player
 Mick Slaven (born 1961), Scottish musician

See also
 Slaven (given name)
 Slavens